Vetter Pharma-Fertigung GmbH & Co. KG is a contract manufacturer that has supplied the pharmaceutical industry since 1950. The company has production sites in Germany, Austria and the U.S., as well as sales offices in Singapore, Japan and South Korea. 

Vetter is an independent international specialist in the aseptic filling of syringes, cartridges and vials, and for assembling safety devices, pens and autoinjectors. With an annual capacity of 400 million units, Vetter is one of the world market leaders in the field of pre-filled injection systems.

History 

The company was founded in 1953 by Helmut Vetter (1920–1999) and was originally called the “Apotheker Vetter & Co. Arzneimittel GmbH Ravensburg". Vetter began operation of a chemical-pharmaceutical laboratory in 1945, and a tenancy in the long-standing Marien-Apotheke in Ravensburg in 1950. In the beginning, the company mainly produced cachets, in particular, the self-developed stomach medicine, “Ullus capsules”. One year later, the rapidly expanding company moved into a four-story building in the center of Ravensburg. In 1958, Helmut Vetter opened a pharmacy including a perfumery and Reformhaus and sealed the drugs it manufactured in air- and water-tight packaging. In 1965, his growing enterprise began operating as a contract manufacturer packaging dry and liquid drugs. The company manufactured primarily contact lens solutions and eye drops. In 1975, the company turned its focus to aseptically pre-filled syringes. Vetter founded its first foreign subsidiary in the United States in 1983, Vetter Pharma Turm Inc. (Yardley, Pennsylvania), to handle sales in the United States and Canada. The following year, the company was renamed Vetter Pharma-Fertigung GmbH & Co. KG. In 1988, the U.S. Food and Drug Administration (FDA) granted Vetter's Ravensburg facility approval to operate, which opened the U.S. market. At that point, the pharmaceutical service provider had just 350 employees. Two years later, the company invented the dual-chamber syringe, which remains a patented product. Freeze-dried (lyophilized) drug resides in one chamber; liquid in the other. Pushing the plunger mixes the two, reconstituting the drug. The technology prolongs shelf-life, facilitates accurate dosing, and enables
patients to self-administer. Over the years that followed, production processes were mostly automated. In 1996, a second German production site was established, in Langenargen, and received approval to operate by the FDA two years later. In 2004, the company started construction on a second major site in Ravensburg. Completed at the end of 2006, the Ravensburg Vetter South production facility received permission by the regional board of Tuebingen (the local government) to begin operating at the start of 2007; the FDA gave its production approval in early 2008. At the end of 2007, work began at Ravensburg Vetter South on a new facility to house secondary packaging and began operations in May 2009. At the same site, an analytical laboratory was established in the same year. Also in 2009, the company founded its sales subsidiary Vetter Pharma International GmbH, and named its U.S. sales subsidiary Vetter Pharma International USA Inc. In December 2009, the company dedicated its first U.S. manufacturing facility, located in suburban Chicago. In May 2012, Vetter completed its new Center for Visual Inspection and Logistics. With a number of innovative technologies for producing electricity and promoting efficient use of resources, Vetter continues to set high standards in terms of sustainability at its Ravensburg Vetter West facility.

In the same year, the pharmaceutical service provider was honored as “employer most supportive of voluntary work” by the federal state of Baden-Württemberg. Due to the increasing customer demand for support in drug development and the need for more advanced IT systems in light of digitalization, the Schuetzenstrasse site in Ravensburg was expanded in 2016. Also, in 2016, the site underwent further expansion when Vetter began construction of a new production building. In that same year, the company also presented its first plans for a long-term investment project in the US, the aim of which was to offer global customers additional production capabilities for their pharmaceuticals within the US. In 2017, Vetter laid the foundation for a new administration building where, beginning in 2020, the workplace of approximately 1,000 employees are located. In 2018, the company explored new directions regarding injections. Under the slogan “Injection 2.0”, the Vetter Open Innovation Challenge was initiated. Multi-disciplinary teams analyzed the applicability of digital trends in injection processes. Within the scope of the innovation process, promising ideas were further pursued and the winning team of the competition was awarded a prize of 10,000 euros. In addition, the pharmaceutical service provider relies on expanded capacities and a modular production in secondary packaging and, therefore, constructed a new building at the Ravensburg Vetter Sued site, which was moved into in the middle of 2020. To expand its presence in the Asia-Pacific region the pharmaceutical service provider opened another sales office in the greater Seoul area in 2018. Furthermore, the company made the “List of German Word Market Leaders” of the German business news magazine, “Wirtschaftswoche”. This was the same year Vetter introduced collaborative working with the automated YuMi® robot (You&Me) for final packaging. Furthermore, the demand for development projects within the early clinical phases grew continuously. As a result, the US site in Skokie, Chicago, was expanded from 3,500 square meters to approximately 4,700 square meters with additional extensions to the site in 2019.

Vetter moved into its new RVK (Ravensburg Vetter Kammerbruehl) headquarters during its anniversary year 2020, where approximately 1,000 employees are now located. The same year, the pharmaceutical service provider took over a production site in Rankweil, Austria. In 2020, Vetter announced its strategic cooperation with Rentschler Biopharma SE with a goal of expanding its own service portfolio and offering complementary services alongside the value chain. In September of the same year, Vetter also inaugurated its first own training center at the Kammerbruehl site in Ravensburg. Here at the center, trainees will learn a variety of skills including milling and lathing and 3D printing, as well as gain insight into topics such as pneumatics and robotics within various workshops. In 2020, the pharmaceutical service provider welcomed its 5000th employee.

In March 2021, Vetter announced the opening of a new business entity in Shanghai, China, in order to offer support to domestic companies that plan on bringing their molecules to the global market. By September of the same year, all German, Austrian, US, and Asian production sites and sales offices were climate neutral. At the end of 2021, Vetter Development Service in Rankweil, Austria received manufacturing authorization. As a result of the successful inspection held by the responsible national regulatory authority, the Austrian Agency for Health and Food Safety (AGES), the site can now support clinical development projects from international pharmaceutical and biotech companies. By the end of 2021, the number of employees had increased to 5700.

Management Board 
In addition to the Vetter management team, which consists of two managing directors, an independent advisory board also assists the company. The advisory board has been chaired by Udo J. Vetter since 2008. Since 2012, he has also been vice president of a German family association called 'Die Familienunternehmer' and, since 2019, president of its European counterpart, the European Family Businesses. In 2018, he was granted the title of “honorary senator” for his long-term commitment to the University Council at the University of Albstadt-Sigmaringen.

Importance for the U.S. 
In the United States Vetter is listed at Critical Foreign Dependencies Initiative (CFDI), a strategy and list, maintained by the United States Department of Homeland Security, of foreign infrastructure which, if attacked or destroyed, would critically impact the U.S."

References 

Companies based in Baden-Württemberg
Pharmaceutical companies of Germany